Marshall Johnson Wellborn (May 29, 1808 – October 16, 1874) was an American politician, lawyer and jurist.

Born near Eatonton, Georgia in 1808 and attended the University of Georgia (UGA) in Athens. He studied law and was admitted to the state bar in 1826. He began practicing law in Columbus, Georgia, and was elected to the Georgia House of Representatives in 1833 and 1834. From 1838 through 1842, he was a Georgia superior court judge.

Wellborn was elected in 1848 as a Democrat to represent Georgia's 2nd congressional district in the United States House of Representatives during the 31st Congress. After his congressional service, Wellborn became an ordained Baptist minister in 1864.  He died in Columbus on October 16, 1874, and was buried in historic Oakland Cemetery in Atlanta, Georgia.

References

1808 births
1874 deaths
Democratic Party members of the Georgia House of Representatives
Georgia (U.S. state) lawyers
University of Georgia alumni
Democratic Party members of the United States House of Representatives from Georgia (U.S. state)
People from Putnam County, Georgia
People from Columbus, Georgia
American slave owners
19th-century American politicians
Burials at Oakland Cemetery (Atlanta)
19th-century American lawyers